Fairy-tale opera may refer to any of several traditions of opera based on fairy tales.

Opéra féerie is a French genre of opera or opéra-ballet, often with elements of magic in their stories.
The English genre of "fairy opera" includes Gilbert and Sullivan's Iolanthe
Hänsel und Gretel is considered a key work of the genre.

References

Opera genres